Horace Wilbur "Hod" Leverette (February 4, 1889 – April 10, 1958) was a Major League Baseball pitcher who played for the St. Louis Browns in .

External links

1889 births
1958 deaths
St. Louis Browns players
Major League Baseball pitchers
Baseball players from Shreveport, Louisiana